Weisskirchen (also Weißkirchen or Weiskirchen) may refer to:

Places

 Weißkirchen in Steiermark, Austria
 Weißkirchen an der Traun, Austria
 Bílý Kostel nad Nisou, Liberec District, Czech Republic
 Hranice (Přerov District), Czech Republic
 Blanche-Église, France
 Weiskirchen, Saarland, Germany
 A city part of Rodgau, Hesse, Germany
 Bela Crkva, Banat, Serbia
 Holíč, Slovakia

People
 Gert Weisskirchen (born 1944), German politician
 Max Weißkirchen (born 1996), German badminton player

See also 
 Whitchurch (disambiguation) (English-language equivalent)